Mário Lino Soares Correia (born 31 May 1940 in Lisbon), commonly known as Mário Lino, is a Portuguese civil engineer and former politician. He was the Minister of Public Works, Transportation and Communication in the 17th Constitutional Government of Portugal, from 2005 to 2009.

References

External links
Biography on Portugal.gov.pt

1940 births
Living people
Socialist Party (Portugal) politicians
Government ministers of Portugal